Events in the year 1939 in Brazil.

Incumbents

Federal government
President: Getúlio Vargas

Governors 
 Alagoas: Osman Laurel
 Amazonas: Álvaro Botelho Maia 
 Bahia: Landulfo Alves
 Ceará: Francisco de Meneses Pimentel
 Espírito Santo: João Punaro Bley
 Goiás: Pedro Ludovico Teixeira
 Maranhão:
 Mato Grosso: Júlio Strübing Müller
 Minas Gerais: Benedito Valadares Ribeiro
 Pará: José Carneiro da Gama Malcher
 Paraíba: Argemiro de Figueiredo 
 Paraná: Manuel Ribas
 Pernambuco: Agamenon Magalhães
 Piauí: Leônidas Melo 
 Rio Grande do Norte: Rafael Fernandes Gurjão 
 Rio Grande do Sul: Osvaldo Cordeiro de Farias
 Santa Catarina: Nereu Ramos
 São Paulo: Ademar de Barros
 Sergipe: Erônides de Carvalho

Vice governors 
 Rio Grande do Norte: no vice governor
 São Paulo: no vice governor

Events
27 June – The municipality of Canoas obtains city status.
30 November – Serra dos Órgãos National Park is created
5 December – The Imperial Mausoleum is officially inaugurated at the Cathedral of Petrópolis.

Arts and culture

Films
El Grito de la juventud (Argentine film directed by Brazilian director Raul Roulien)

Music
Ary Barroso - "Aquarela do Brasil"

Births
2 February - Maximira Figueiredo, actress (died 2018) 
8 February - Jonas Bloch, actor
14 March - Glauber Rocha, film director, actor and writer (died 1981).
30 April - Axel Schmidt-Preben, Olympic sailor (died 2018 )
13 June - Antônio Pitanga, actor
16 October - Suely Franco, actress and entertainer

Deaths
19 April - Lucílio de Albuquerque, painter (born 1887).
16 October - Malvina Tavares, anarchist, poet, and educator (born 1866)
25 November - Odette Vidal de Oliveira, candidate for beatification (born 1930).

References

See also 
1939 in Brazilian football
List of Brazilian films of 1939

 
1930s in Brazil
Years of the 20th century in Brazil
Brazil
Brazil